KTNQ (1020 AM) is a radio station licensed to Los Angeles, California, with a Spanish news/talk format. It is owned by Latino Media Network; under a local marketing agreement, it is programmed by former owner TelevisaUnivision's Uforia Audio Network. From its original licensing on March 13, 1925 until 1955 it was called KFVD.  The station has studios on the Univision Broadcast Center building located on 5999 Center Drive (near I-405) in West Los Angeles, and the transmitter is located in the City of Industry.  The station was originally restricted in its broadcast hours, signing off at local sunset to protect 1020 KDKA Pittsburgh from nighttime sky wave interference.  Later, the FCC allowed geographically spread daytime stations to operate at night with a directional pattern away from the previously protected station.  1020 kHz in Los Angeles was then allowed to operate as a 24 hour station.

History

KFVD
J. Frank Burke was a "news-analyst, commentator, noted for his American progressiveness, tolerance, and liberalism", and owner and operator of both KFVD and KPAS. The FCC later gave notice to dispose of one of the stations.

From 1937 to 1939, Woody Guthrie broadcast regular shows from KFVD, then run by Frank Burke Sr. and his son Frank Burke  First he accompanied his Cousin Leon "Oklahoma Jack" Guthrie, later with Maxine "Lefty Lou" Chrissman. The Woody and Lefty Lou-Show soon became the most popular on the station.  When Chrissman resigned due to health reasons, Guthrie continued for another year as The Lone Wolf until he was sacked for his unrelenting support for the Soviet Union even after they invaded Poland.

KPOP & KGBS
From August 1, 1955 until 1960 it was called KPOP.

From June 29, 1960 until 1976, it was called KGBS.

KTNQ
On December 26, 1976 the station's call sign was changed to the current KTNQ, originally billed as "The New Ten Q." KTNQ would later change languages to Spanish at noon on July 31, 1979.

During the late 1970s along with competitor stations such as KHJ (AM) and San Diego-based XETRA-AM ("The Mighty 690"), the station specialized in Top 40 music, and was broadcast in English.  The radio station figures prominently in the Ron Howard film Grand Theft Auto. where disc jockey "The Real" Don Steele is doing a live broadcast from a helicopter with the station's call sign following two star-crossed lovers.

Talk programming
KTNQ was a part of the Univision America Talk Radio network as of July 4, 2012. While the network itself ceased operations in 2015, KTNQ aired the remnants of Univision America's programming as well as local news, weather, and sports.

KTNQ has been the Spanish language flagship station of the Los Angeles Dodgers since 2011. It also broadcast Dodger games from 1979 to 1986.

Sports programming
On December 20, 2016, Univision announced that KTNQ would be one of the charter affiliates of Univision Deportes Radio, their new Spanish-language sports network launched in April 2017. It continued to broadcast the network upon its June 20, 2019 rebrand to TUDN Radio. In September 2019, KTNQ returned to a locally-programmed Spanish-language news/talk format, after KWKW took on the TUDN Radio affiliation following the shutdown of the competing ESPN Deportes Radio network.

Latino Media Network sale
On June 3, 2022, Univision announced it would sell a package of 18 radio stations across 10 of its markets, primarily AM outlets in large cities (including KTNQ) and entire clusters in smaller markets such as McAllen, Texas, and Fresno, California, for $60 million to a new company known as Latino Media Network (LMN); Univision proposes to handle operations for a year under agreement before turning over operational control to LMN in the fourth quarter of 2023.

References

External links
FCC History Cards for KTNQ

TEN-Q

TNQ
News and talk radio stations in the United States
Radio stations established in 1925
TNQ